Monroe Township is one of fourteen townships in Carroll County, Indiana. As of the 2010 census, its population was 2,797 and it contained 1,265 housing units.

History
Monroe Township was organized in 1840.

Geography

Cities and towns
 Flora

Unincorporated towns
 Bringhurst

Adjacent townships
 Jackson (north)
 Carrollton (east)
 Burlington (southeast)
 Democrat (south)
 Madison (west)
 Deer Creek (northwest)

Major highways
  Indiana State Road 18
  Indiana State Road 75

Cemeteries
The township contains three cemeteries: Maple Lawn, Moss, and Shirar Landis.

Education
Monroe Township residents may obtain a library card at the Flora-Monroe Township Public Library in Flora.

References
 United States Census Bureau cartographic boundary files
 U.S. Board on Geographic Names

External links
 Indiana Township Association
 United Township Association of Indiana

Townships in Carroll County, Indiana
1840 establishments in Indiana
Townships in Indiana